Cyberlove could mean:

 "Cyberlove", a song from the 1998 Falco album Out of the Dark (Into the Light)
 Internet romance